There are three extant species of bird in the genus Icterus that are named troupial (turpial in Spanish), formerly considered one species:
 Venezuelan troupial, Icterus icterus
 Campo troupial, Icterus jamacaii
 Orange-backed troupial, Icterus croconotus
In addition, one extinct species, the Talara troupial (Icterus turmalis) is known from late Quaternary fossil remains from Peru.

Birds by common name